Brunch is a meal, sometimes accompanied by alcoholic drinks (typically champagne or a cocktail). Brunch is typically served between the hours of 10:00AM to 1:30PM. The meal originated in the British hunt breakfast.  The word brunch is a portmanteau of breakfast and lunch. The word originated in England in the late 19th century, and became popular in the United States in the 1930s.

Origin of the word
The 1896 supplement to the Oxford English Dictionary cites Punch magazine, which wrote that the term was coined in Britain in 1895 to describe a Sunday meal for "Saturday-night carousers" in the writer Guy Beringer's article "Brunch: A Plea" in Hunter's Weekly.

Despite the substantially later date, it has also been claimed that the term was possibly coined by reporter Frank Ward O'Malley, who wrote in the early 20th century for the New York newspaper The Sun from 1906 until 1919. It is thought that he may have come up with the term after observing the typical mid-day eating habits of his colleagues at the newspaper.

At colleges and hotels
Some colleges and hotels serve brunch, often serve-yourself buffets, although menu-ordered meals may be available as well. The meal usually consists of standard breakfast foods such as eggs, sausages, bacon, ham, fruits, pastries, pancakes, waffles, cereals, and scones.

Military
The United States, Canada and United Kingdom militaries often serve weekend brunch in their messes. They offer breakfast and lunch options, and usually are open from  09:00-13:00.

Dim Sum brunch
The dim sum brunch is popular in Chinese restaurants worldwide.  It consists of a variety of stuffed buns, dumplings, and other savory or sweet foods that have been steamed, deep-fried, or baked. Customers select small portions from passing carts, as the kitchen continuously produces and sends out freshly prepared dishes. Dim sum is usually eaten at a mid-morning, midday, or mid-afternoon teatime.

Special occasions 
Brunch is prepared by restaurants and hotels for special occasions, such as weddings, Valentine's Day, St. Patrick's Day, Mother's Day, Father's Day, Halloween, Thanksgiving, Christmas, New Year's and Easter.

In other languages

Chinese
The Chinese word "早午饭" is defined as brunch, with "早饭" (早: morning, 饭: meal) meaning breakfast; and "午饭" (午: noon, 饭: meal) meaning lunch. The combination of "早饭" and "午饭" is thus "早午饭", brunch.

French
The Office québécois de la langue française accepts 'brunch' as a valid word but also provides a synonym déjeuner-buffet. Note that, however, in Quebec, déjeuner alone (even without the qualifying adjective petit) means 'breakfast'. In Quebec, the word—when francized—is pronounced .

Italian

Usage of these terms varies in Italy, as different regions have different cultural definitions of mealtimes and their names. In this scheme, a separate term for 'brunch' would not be necessary, as  could be used as a general term for any meal taken in the morning or early afternoon. Although Italian meal terminologies have generally shifted since widespread use of this naming scheme, the concept of a distinct mid-morning meal combining features of breakfast and lunch is largely one imported from the UK and North America in the last century, so the Anglicism 'brunch' is predominant.

Other places

Canada 
The area now known as Leslieville neighbourhood is sometimes called the brunch capital of Toronto, as many renowned establishments serve brunch there. Brunch buffets also exist in other parts of Southern Ontario, including Kitchener-Waterloo, where the German-term Smorgasborgs was sometimes used, from the 1970s onward.

In Canada, brunch is served in private homes and in restaurants. In both cases, brunch typically consists of the same dishes as would be standard in an American brunch, namely, coffee, tea, fruit juices, breakfast foods, including pancakes, waffles, and french toast; meats such as ham, bacon, and sausages; egg dishes such as scrambled eggs, omelettes, and Eggs Benedict; bread products, such as toast, bagels or croissants; pastries or cakes, such as cinnamon rolls and coffee cake; and fresh cut fruit or fruit salad. Brunches may also include foods not typically associated with breakfast, such as roasted meats, quiche, soup, smoked salmon, sandwiches, and salads, such as Cobb salad.

When served at home or in a restaurant, a brunch may be offered buffet style, in which trays of foods and beverages are available and guests may serve themselves and select the items they want, often in an "all-you-can-eat" fashion. Restaurant brunches may also be served from a menu, in which case guests select specific items that are served by waitstaff. Restaurant brunch meals range from relatively inexpensive brunches available at diners and family restaurants to expensive brunches served at high-end restaurants and bistros.

Philippines

Brunch in the Philippines is served between 9:00 am and noon. Contrary to what is observed in other countries, brunch in the afternoon, between 3:00 and 4:00 pm, is called merienda, a traditional snack carried over from Spanish colonialism.

Gallery

See also

 Drag brunch
 Elevenses
 Israeli breakfast
 List of breakfast topics
 List of brunch foods
 Second breakfast

References

External links

"The Birth of Brunch: Where Did This Meal Come From Anyway?" Smithsonian.com
Wikibooks Cookbook

 
Breakfast
Meals
1890s neologisms